Epitoxis procridia is a moth of the subfamily Arctiinae. It was described by George Hampson in 1898. It is found in Kenya and Uganda.

References

Arctiinae
Moths described in 1898